Fort Hill, also known as Fort Hill Farm, is a historic plantation house and national historic district located near Burlington, Mineral County, West Virginia.  The district includes 15 contributing buildings, 1 contributing site, and 2 contributing structures.  The main house was completed in 1853, and is a two-story, "L"-shaped brick dwelling composed of a side gable roofed, five bay building with a rear extension in the Federal style.  It features a three-bay, one-story front porch supported by four one foot square Tuscan order columns.  Also on the property are a number of contributing buildings including a washhouse and cellar, outhouse, a dairy and ice house, a meat house, a garage, a hog house, poultry houses, a bank barn with silo, and a well. The family cemetery is across the road west of the main house.  Located nearby and in the district is "Woodside," a schoolhouse built about 1890, and a tenant house and summer kitchen.

It was listed on the National Register of Historic Places in 1996.

References

Houses on the National Register of Historic Places in West Virginia
Historic districts in Mineral County, West Virginia
Federal architecture in West Virginia
Houses completed in 1853
Houses in Mineral County, West Virginia
Plantation houses in West Virginia
National Register of Historic Places in Mineral County, West Virginia
Historic districts on the National Register of Historic Places in West Virginia